Tim McKenzie (born July 21, 1982) is a retired American professional mixed martial artist. A professional competitor from 2001 until 2011, he fought in the Ultimate Fighting Championship, World Extreme Cagefighting, Pancrase, and Tachi Palace Fights. Known for his exciting fighting style, only one of his 23 career bouts made it to a decision.

Background
Born and raised in California, McKenzie began training in MMA while attending University of the Pacific alongside fellow fighters Nick Diaz and his younger brother Nate Diaz, under the tutelage of head coach Cesar Gracie. Later during his career McKenzie moved to Tempe, Arizona to train with AZ Combat Sports.

Mixed martial arts career

Early career
McKenzie made his professional debut in 2001, winning his first two fights via first-round TKO, before being signed by the WEC.

World Extreme Cagefighting
McKenzie made his debut for the pre-Zuffa owned WEC at WEC 6 on March 27, 2003. McKenzie won via TKO in the first round.

McKenzie then won his next four consecutive fights, bringing his career record to an undefeated 7-0 before making his next WEC appearance at WEC 10 against Alex Stiebling. McKenzie was handed his first professional loss via arm-triangle choke in the second round. McKenzie made his next promotional appearance at WEC 17 against Scott Smith and was defeated via first-round TKO.

After the loss to Smith, McKenzie fought Doug Marshall at WEC 17 and won in dominating fashion, finishing the future WEC Light Heavyweight Champion in the first round via TKO. After a loss to Steve Cantwell via rear-naked choke submission at WEC 33, McKenzie made his last appearance for the promotion at WEC 34 against Jeremy Lang and won via guillotine choke submission in the third round.

Ultimate Fighting Championship
McKenzie made his UFC debut at UFC Fight Night: Condit vs. Kampmann on April 1, 2009 against Aaron Simpson. McKenzie was defeated in the first round via TKO.

Post-UFC
Since leaving the UFC, McKenzie has gone 2–3 in his last five fights. McKenzie most recently competed on April 16, 2011 at Showdown Fights: Shootout against Jordan Smith. McKenzie won via knockout 11 seconds into the fight.

Mixed martial arts record

|-
| Win
| align=center| 14–9
| Jordan Smith
| TKO (punches)
| Showdown Fights: Shootout
| 
| align=center| 1
| align=center| 0:11
| Orem, Utah, United States
| 
|-
| Loss
| align=center| 13–9
| Seth Baczynski
| TKO (elbows & punches)
| TPF 7: Deck the Halls
| 
| align=center| 1
| align=center| 2:15
| Lemoore, California, United States
| Catchweight (174 lbs) bout. Controversial loss due to Baczynski "phantom tapping" due to an armbar, prompting McKenzie to release it before referee stoppage.
|-
| Loss
| align=center| 13–8
| Josh Thornburg
| Submission (armbar)
| Global Knockout: Fall Brawl
| 
| align=center| 1
| align=center| 0:59
| Jackson, California, United States
| 
|-
| Win
| align=center| 13–7
| Marcus Gaines
| Submission (armbar)
| RF: Rebel Fighter
| 
| align=center| 1
| align=center| 2:58
| Placerville, California, United States
| 
|-
| Loss
| align=center| 12–7
| David Mitchell
| Submission (guillotine choke)
| TPF 4: Cinco de Mayhem
| 
| align=center| 1
| align=center| 1:10
| Lemoore, California, United States
| Return to Welterweight; for the inaugural Tachi Palace Fights Welterweight Championship.
|-
| Loss
| align=center| 12–6
| Aaron Simpson
| TKO (punches)
| UFC Fight Night: Condit vs. Kampmann
| 
| align=center| 1
| align=center| 1:40
| Nashville, Tennessee, United States
| 
|-
| Win
| align=center| 12–5
| Jeremy Lang
| Submission (guillotine choke)
| WEC 34
| 
| align=center| 3
| align=center| 0:40
| Sacramento, California, United States
|Return to Middleweight.
|-
| Loss
| align=center| 11–5
| Steve Cantwell
| Submission (rear-naked choke)
| WEC 33
| 
| align=center| 1
| align=center| 2:13
| Las Vegas, Nevada, United States
| 
|-
| Win
| align=center| 11–4
| Yuichi Nakanishi
| Submission (rear-naked choke)
| BODOGFight: Vancouver
| 
| align=center| 2
| align=center| 1:12
| Vancouver, British Columbia, Canada
| 
|-
| Loss
| align=center| 10–4
| Chael Sonnen
| Submission (D'arce choke)
| BODOGFight: Costa Rica Combat
| 
| align=center| 1
| align=center| 0:13
| Costa Rica
| 
|-
| Win
| align=center| 10–3
| Mike McGuinnes
| TKO
| ICFO 1: Stockton
| 
| align=center| 1
| align=center| N/A
| Stockton, California, United States
| 
|-
| Win
| align=center| 9–3
| Doug Marshall
| TKO (punches & elbows)
| WEC 19
| 
| align=center| 1
| align=center| 3:35
| Lemoore, California, United States
| 
|-
| Loss
| align=center| 8–3
| Scott Smith
| TKO (punches)
| WEC 17
| 
| align=center| 1
| align=center| 2:25
| Lemoore, California, United States
| 
|-
| Win
| align=center| 8–2
| Bill Mahood
| KO (punches)
| Freedom Fight: Canada vs USA
| 
| align=center| 1
| align=center| 0:06
| Hull, Quebec, Canada
| 
|-
| Loss
| align=center| 7–2
| Akihiro Gono
| TKO (punches)
| Pancrase: Brave 10
| 
| align=center| 2
| align=center| 2:53
| Chiba, Japan
| 
|-
| Loss
| align=center| 7–1
| Alex Stiebling
| Submission (arm-triangle choke)
| WEC 10
| 
| align=center| 2
| align=center| 2:25
| Lemoore, California, United States
| 
|-
| Win
| align=center| 7–0
| Emanuel Newton
| Decision
| ROTR: Rage on the River
| 
| align=center| 3
| align=center| 3:00
| Redding, California, United States
| 
|-
| Win
| align=center| 6–0
| Kenny Kingsford
| TKO
| IFC: Battleground Tahoe
| 
| align=center| 2
| align=center| 2:02
| Lake Tahoe, Nevada, United States
|Light Heavyweight debut.
|-
| Win
| align=center| 5–0
| Chris Kiever
| Submission (heel hook)
| IFC: Rumble on the Rio
| 
| align=center| 1
| align=center| 0:29
| Hidalgo, Texas, United States
|Heavyweight debut.
|-
| Win
| align=center| 4–0
| Shane Davis
| Submission (armbar)
| IFC WC 18: Big Valley Brawl
| 
| align=center| 1
| align=center| 1:31
| Lakeport, California, United States
| 
|-
| Win
| align=center| 3–0
| John Appleby
| TKO (punches)
| WEC 6
| 
| align=center| 1
| align=center| 1:03
| Lemoore, California, United States
| 
|-
| Win
| align=center| 2–0
| Paul Ward
| TKO
| IFC: Night of the Warriors 3
| 
| align=center| 1
| align=center| 1:04
| Iona, California, United States
|Middleweight debut.
|-
| Win
| align=center| 1–0
| Dax Bruce
| TKO (punches)
| IFC WC 16: Warriors Challenge 16
| 
| align=center| 1
| align=center| N/A
| Orville, California, United States
|

References

External links

Living people
American male mixed martial artists
Mixed martial artists from California
Middleweight mixed martial artists
1982 births
Ultimate Fighting Championship male fighters